Lametasaurus ( - meaning "Lameta lizard") named for the Lameta Formation, Jabalpur, India, is the generic name given to a possibly chimeric dinosaur species.

History of discovery
Between October 1917 and 1919 Charles Alfred Matley excavated fossils near Jabalpur. In 1921 he reported the find in the "Carnosaur Bed" of what he considered to be two megalosaurians, theropod dinosaurs. In 1923/1924 he named one of these as the type species Lametasaurus indicus. The generic name refers to the Lameta Formation, dating from the Maastrichtian, the specific name refers to India. However, Matley no longer identified it as a theropod but as a member of the Stegosauria instead, which concept at the time also included the armoured dinosaurs today assigned to the Ankylosauria; at first Matley had seen it as a stegosaurian in the modern sense and even intended to name it as a species of Omosaurus. The type specimen consisted of a number of dermal scutes, a sacrum of at least five sacral vertebrae, a pelvis, a tibia and teeth. In 1933 Matley and Friedrich von Huene described some more remains collected by Barnum Brown, thought to have been part of a tail club; later this was shown to be a large osteoderm.

However, in 1935 Dhirendra Kishore Chakravarti contested the interpretation as an armoured dinosaur. He claimed that the specimen was a chimera including titanosaurid armor, crocodile teeth and theropod hindlimb material. In 1964 Alick Walker chose the scutes as the lectotype, thus removing the teeth and the bones from the type material. The name Lametasaurus now designated the scutes only and was generally considered to represent a member of the Nodosauridae. In 2008 Matthew Carrano e.a. discarded the possibility the scutes were ankylosaurian, stating they were probably titanosaurian, but noted that a comparison to the osteoderms of Ceratosaurus would help in determining its affinities. If in which case the species were to be found ceratosaurian, it would possibly be a senior synonym of Indosaurus and/or Rajasaurus. Most recently, it has been suggested that some of the osteoderms assigned to Lametasaurus show ankylosaurian synapomorphies, which renders Lametasaurus a chimera regardless of the affinities of the other material. 

The type material has been lost, lacking a known inventory number, making it difficult to test the several hypotheses. The taxon is today commonly seen as a nomen dubium.

Notes

External links
Dinosauria Translation and Pronunciation Guide
http://paleodb.org/cgi-bin/bridge.pl?a=basicTaxonInfo&taxon_no=57450

Invalid dinosaurs
Late Cretaceous dinosaurs
Dinosaurs of India and Madagascar
Paleontological chimeras
Taxa named by Charles Alfred Matley
Fossil taxa described in 1923